Katie Power (born 20 November 1991) is an All-Ireland- and All Star-winning camogie player who plays for Piltown and Kilkenny.

Background
The daughter of former Piltown hurler Jim, and former Piltown camogie player Martina (née Brennan), and sister to Martin and Jamie, Power played camogie from a very young age. First tutored by her father, and later by Maura Brennan and Jim Malone, she honed her skills with constant practice and a fierce determination to win.

Katie also participated in athletics, soccer, basketball and Gaelic football as a child but her love for hurling persuaded her to focus on camogie in recent years.

Camogie career
Power earned her first Leinster medal with Kilkenny at U14 in 2003.

Katie made her debut on the Kilkenny Senior team in 2006 and currently fills the position of centre forward. 

In July 2017, Katie's brother Martin won an All-Ireland medal playing in the full forward position on the Kilkenny Intermediate Hurling team.

Roll of honour
Kilkenny GAA
 All-Ireland Senior Camogie Championship (3): 2016, 2020, 2022 
 Runner-up: 2009, 2013, 2014, 2017, 2018, 2019

 National Camogie League (6): 2008, 2014, 2016, 2017, 2018, 2021
 Runner-up: 2010, 2019
Piltown GAA
 All-Ireland Intermediate Club Camogie Championship (1): 2015

Waterford IT
 Ashbourne Cup (4): 2010, 2011, 2012, 2013
 All-Ireland Minor Camogie Championship (3): 2006, 2007, 2008
 All-Ireland Under-16 Camogie Championship (2): 2005, 2006
 Gael Linn Cup (1): 2010

Leinster titles
 8 Senior (2006, 2008, 2009, 2015, 2017, 2018, 2019, 2022)
 3 Minor (2006, 2007, 2008)
 2 Under-16 (2005, 2006)
 2 Under-14 (2003, 2004)

Individual honours
 1 Young Player of the Year (2005)
 4 Camogie All Stars Awards (2009, 2013, 2017, 2018)
 4 Ashbourne All Star Awards (2011, 2012, 2013, 2014)
 11 All Stars nominations
(2009, 2010, 2012, 2013, 2014, 2015, 2016, 2017, 2018, 2019, 2022)

References

External links
 Review of 2009 championship in On The Ball Official Camogie Magazine
 All-Ireland Senior Camogie Championship: Roll of Honour
 Video highlights of 2009 championship - Part One and part two
 Video Highlights of 2009 All Ireland Senior Final
 Report of All Ireland final in Independent

1991 births
Living people
Kilkenny camogie players
Waterford IT camogie players